Silistar is a protected area in the Tsarevo Municipality, Burgas Province, Bulgaria. It includes a river of the same name and a beach. Camping is allowed there.

Geography
It is located about between the villages of Sinemorets and Rezovo, about 5 km from either. It is near the border to Turkey at the mouth of the eponymous river Silistar.

History
Silistar was declared a protected area in 1992 by the Ministry of Environment of Bulgaria. It falls on the territory of the Strandzha Nature Park. Both protected areas are part of the European ecological network Natura 2000.

Gallery

References

External links

1992 establishments in Bulgaria
Bulgarian Black Sea Coast
Geography of Burgas Province
Natura 2000 in Bulgaria
Protected areas established in 1992
Protected areas of Bulgaria
Strandzha
Tourist attractions in Burgas Province